XS Software JSCo is a Bulgarian worldwide producer, developer and publisher of cross platform multiplayer online games. XS Software's headquarters are located in Sofia, Bulgaria.

History 

The company was founded in 2004 by entrepreneur Hristo Tenchev, who is also the CEO and created the first Bulgarian online browser game Bulfleet. After the success of the game, the team started working on more projects and the company  continued to grow.

In 2005, the first version of the second title Khan Wars was released in Bulgaria and in 2008 the internationalization on Khan Wars began. The game was first released in Poland with the support of one of the biggest horizontal portals, Wirtualna Polska.
The company was continuously growing by gaining more international investments, and in 2009, four new titles were released. Khan Wars was translated into 25 languages and released in more than 50 countries worldwide. In 2010, XS Software JSCo started the internationalization of all their games. The company translated its best performing games in up to 40 languages and they subsequently were released in 80 countries.

Games
Games developed by XS Software
 Khan Wars
 Lady Popular
 Nemexia (game)
 Andromeda5

Games published by XS Software
 Sofia Wars
 Taern
 Tropicalla
 Botva
 HeroZero

Awards and nominations 

2011 Forbes Magazine News- Forbes Business Awards
 XS Software was awarded with the Employee of the Year Award.

2011 BHRMDA News- Annual HR Awards 
 In the category "Organizational architecture and design" XS Software won an award for the idea XS LEGO

See also 

 Massively multiplayer online game
 MMORPG
 Browser game
 Cooperative gameplay
 Multiplayer online game 
 Online game
 Spawn installation

References 

Video game companies established in 2004
Video game companies of Bulgaria
Browser-based game websites
Mobile game companies
Video game development companies
Bulgarian companies established in 2004